Venezuela with their three OTI member stations: RCTV, Venevisión and Venezolana de Televisión debuted in the OTI Song Contest in 1972 in Madrid when the festival was held for the first time.

History 
This country won the festival on two occasions, the first one in 1982 with the teenage boy band Unicornio performing the song "Puedes contar conmigo" (You can count on me). The second Venezuelan victory came in 1987 in Lisbon with Alfredo Alejandro, who performed the song "La felicidad esá en un rincón de tu corazón" (The happiness is inside a corner of your heart).

Apart from their victories, the South American country got two second places in 1976 and 1979 and three third places in 1974, 1975 and 1994.

Many Venezuelan singers well known in all Latin America, such as Jose Luis Rodríguez El Puma, her daughter Lilibeth Morillo, Mirla Castellanos, and Delia Dorta represented their country in the OTI Festival with successful participations.

Venezuela hosted the contest in 1979. The venue of the festival was the Bolivarian Army Circle Theatre of Caracas and the presenters were Eduardo Serrano and Carmen Victoria Pérez, who presented the event in a golden and blue colored stage. The opening theme of this edition of the festival was an orchestral fantasy based on the hymn,   "Alma llanera".

Contestants

References